Graciella epipleuralis is a species of beetle in the family Cerambycidae. It was described by Stephan von Breuning in 1950. It is known from Cameroon.

References

Endemic fauna of Cameroon
Tragocephalini
Beetles described in 1950